Boris Evgenyevich Votchal (June 9, 1895 in Kiev - September 19, 1971 in Moscow) was a Soviet scientist, Academician of the USSR Academy of Medical Sciences (since 1969), Honored Scientist of the Russian Federation (1966), one of the founders of the clinical pharmacology in Russia.

He was a son of Academician Eugene Votchal.

He graduated from the Faculty of Medicine of the Taras Shevchenko National University of Kyiv in 1918.
He was a student of Feofil Yanovsky.

He worked at the Russian Medical Academy of Postgraduate Education.
He was elected a Corresponding Member of the USSR Academy of Medical Sciences in 1963.

Votchal is the author about 250 scientific papers.

Sources
 Big Medical Encyclopedia (in Russian)

1895 births
1971 deaths
Soviet pharmacologists
Academicians of the USSR Academy of Medical Sciences
Honoured Scientists of the Russian Federation